Copper beech may refer to:

Architecture 
 Copper Beech Manor, built in 1857, in Lewisburg, Pennsylvania

Botanical 
 Copper beech (tree) (Fagus sylvatica purpurea), an ornamental cultivar of the European beech (Fagus sylvatica)

Literature 
 "The Adventure of the Copper Beeches", an 1892 Sherlock Holmes story by Arthur Conan Doyle, part of the collection The Adventures of Sherlock Holmes
 The Copper Beech, a 1992 novel by Maeve Binchy
 Blutbuch (Swiss German for 'Copper beech'), a 2022 book by Swiss author Kim de l'Horizon